The House at 2 Nichols Street in Wakefield, Massachusetts, is a well-preserved, architecturally eclectic house built in the 1890s.  The -story frame house has elements of the Tudor Revival, Queen Anne, and Shingle styles, and is one of two identical houses built by local builder Berndt Heurlin.  It has a hip roof, but transverse gables, one of which has a rounded bay, giving it a Queen Anne feel.  The foundation exterior is fieldstone, and there are several stained glass windows.

The house was listed on the National Register of Historic Places in 1989.

The house was also the childhood home of the renowned Swedish-American artist, Magnus Colcord Heurlin (July 5, 1895 – March 10, 1986). Colcord Heurlin attended the Fenway School of Illustration in Boston, MA, where he studied under Harold Mathews Brett (1880-1955), the director of the newly opened school. Heurlin began illustrating covers for pulp magazines in the 1920s and 1930s and later joined the WPA Federal Arts Project, creating two murals for the Bedford Elementary School in Westport, CT. But he is best known for his vivid, oil-pastel depictions of Alaskan natives and early settler life in northern Alaska.

See also
National Register of Historic Places listings in Wakefield, Massachusetts
National Register of Historic Places listings in Middlesex County, Massachusetts
Magnus Colcord Heurlin

References

Houses in Wakefield, Massachusetts
Houses on the National Register of Historic Places in Wakefield, Massachusetts
Shingle Style houses
Houses completed in 1890
Shingle Style architecture in Massachusetts